Many countries have different flags, and now about Uzbekistan.

National Flag

Government Flag

Military Flag

Autonomous Republic

Historical Flags

References

Uzbekistan

Flags